Road routes in Tasmania assist drivers navigating roads in urban, rural, and scenic areas of the state. The route numbering system is composed of National Highway 1, and three categories of alphanumeric routes: 'A' routes, which are the state's most important arterial roads; 'B' routes, other important sub-arterial and connecting roads; and 'C' routes, significant minor roads.

The current route numbering system was introduced in 1979, based on the British alphanumeric system from 1963. The new system aimed to upgrade the signing of destinations, including previously unmarked roads, and to simplify navigation by allowing visitors to follow numbered routes. There have been various changes to the system over the years, including a few minor adjustments after a 2011 review by the Road Route Code Advisory Group.

Road route zones
For the purpose of allocation of route numbers the state has been divided into eight zones, each delineated by major highways. Where possible the numbering of zones was chosen from adjacent highway route numbers. With a few exceptions all routes in a zone have a number that commences with the zone number. Thus, A7, B71 and C701 are all in zone 7.

Zone 1
Zone 1 covers a section of the north coast and a substantial inland area to the south, reaching almost to Hobart. It is delineated as follows:
 The junction of the A2 road (Bass Highway) and the A10 Road (Murchison Highway) in Somerset is the north-west corner of the zone.
 The A2 road from Somerset to Burnie, and National Route 1 from Burnie to its junction with the A5 road (Lake Highway) in Deloraine forms the northern and north-eastern boundary.
 The A5 road from Deloraine to its junction with National Route 1 in Melton Mowbray, and National Route 1 from Melton Mowbray to its junction with the B10 road in Bridgewater form the eastern boundary.
 The B10 road, from Bridgewater to its junction with the A10 road (Lyell Highway) in New Norfolk forms the south-eastern boundary.
 The A10 road (Lyell Highway to Queenstown) forms the southern boundary, and its continuation (Zeehan Highway to Zeehan and Murchison Highway to Somerset) forms the western boundary.

Zone 2
Zone 2 covers the north-west corner of the state, from the Zone 1 western boundary to the coast as far south as Macquarie Harbour. King Island is included in this zone.

Zone 3
Zone 3 covers the south-east corner of the state, including the northern part of Hobart. It is delineated as follows:
 The junction of National Route 1 and the A4 road (Esk Highway) in Conara is the north-west corner of the zone.
 The A4 road from Conara to its junction with the A3 road (Tasman Highway) in Falmouth forms the northern boundary.
 The A3 road from Falmouth to Bicheno and the coastline from Bicheno to the Derwent River form the eastern and southern boundaries.
 National Route 1 from Hobart to Conara forms the western boundary.

Zone 4
Zone 4 covers a section of the north-east of the state, from the Zone 3 northern boundary to Zone 8, which occupies the north-east corner of the state. It is delineated as follows:
 The junction of National Route 1 (northbound) and the A3 road (eastbound) in Launceston is the north-west corner of the zone.
 The A3 road from Launceston to the A4 road in Falmouth forms the northern boundary.
 The A4 road from Falmouth to National Route 1 at Conara forms the eastern and southern boundaries.
 National Route 1 from Conara to Launceston forms the western boundary.

Zone 5
Zone 5 covers a section of central Tasmania to the west of National Route 1, which separates it from Zones 3 and 4. It is delineated as follows:
 The junction of National Route 1 and the A5 road in Deloraine is the north-west corner of the zone.
 National Route 1 from Deloraine to Hagley, the B54 road from Hagley to Travellers Rest, and National Route 1 from Travellers Rest to Prospect form the northern boundary.
 National Route 1 from Prospect to the A5 road at Melton Mowbray forms the eastern boundary.
 The A5 road from Melton Mowbray to Deloraine forms the southern and western boundaries.

Zone 6
Zone 6 covers the area south and west of the Derwent River and south and west of the A10 road as far west as Derwent Bridge. Bruny Island is included in this zone.

Zone 7
Zone 7 covers the area west of the Tamar River to National Route 1 from Devonport to Deloraine, the B54 road from Deloraine to National Route 1 at Travellers Rest, and National Route 1 from Travellers Rest to Launceston. It also includes a small area north of Launceston, east of the Tamar, west of the A8 road (East Tamar Highway) and south of the B73 road (Batman Highway)

Zone 8
Zone 8 covers the north-east corner of the state, east of the Tamar River. Its southern road boundaries are:
 B73 road (Batman Highway)
 A8 road (East Tamar Highway)
 A3 road (Tasman Highway)

Flinders Island is included in this zone.

Routes

National Highway 1 and A routes
These are the state’s most important arterial roads.

B routes
These are other important sub-arterial and connecting roads.

B10 to B50

B51 to B110

C routes
These are significant minor roads.

C101 to C130

C131 to C160

C161 to C199

C201 to C230

C231 to C299

C301 to C330

C331 to C399

C401 to C499

C501 to C599

C601 to C630

C631 to C699

C701 to C730

C731 to C799

C801 to C830

C831 to C899

Touring routes

Official tasmanian touring routes.

Source:

See also

 List of highways in Tasmania

References

Further reading
 Commonwealth Bureau of Roads (Australia) (1978) National highways linking Hobart, Launceston and Burnie : approaches to Hobart. Canberra : Australian Government Publishing Service, Parliamentary paper PP no. 124/1977  Chairman: H.T. Loxton. 

Tasmania

Roads